At the 1960 Summer Olympics in Rome, 34 events in athletics were contested, 24 by men and 10 by women. There were a total number of 1016 participating athletes from 73 countries.

Medal summary

Men

Women

Medal table

Records broken
During the 1960 Summer Olympic Games, 28 new Olympic records and 4 new world records were set in the athletics events.

Men's Olympic and world records

Women's Olympic and world records

References
 International Olympic Committee results database
 Athletics Australia

 
1960
1960 Summer Olympics events
O
International athletics competitions hosted by Italy
1960 Olympics